Bellevue High School is a public high school in Bellevue, Ohio.  It is the only high school in the Bellevue City School District.  Athletic teams are known as the Redmen and Lady Redmen. A long time member of the Northern Ohio League (1944-2017), Bellevue joined the Sandusky Bay Conference in 2017. The current building was built in 1962.

State championships

 Boys Basketball – 1945 
 Boys Baseball – 1985 
 Boys Cross Country – 1984, 1985 
 Girls Cross Country – 1987

Notable alumni

Arthur F. Gorham (Class of 1932) - Led paratroopers of the 82nd Airborne Division during the invasion of Sicily during World War II; twice awarded the Distinguished Service Cross
Vice Admiral John W. Greenslade (Class of 1895) - Vice Admiral & U.S. Commander of the Pacific-Southern Naval Coastal Frontier during World War II
Christi Paul (Class of 1987) - News Anchor on HLN
Brad Snyder (Class of 2000) - The 2003 Mid-American Conference Baseball Player of the Year, an NCAA Division I All-American, and Outfielder in Chicago Cubs minor

Bibliography
 Drown, William.  "Bellevue and Historic Lyme Village (OH)." Chicago: Arcadia Publishing, 2002. .

References

External links
 

High schools in Sandusky County, Ohio
Public high schools in Ohio
High School